Nordland County Municipality is the regional governing administration of Nordland county in Norway. The main responsibilities of the county municipality includes the running of 16 upper secondary schools, with 9,500 pupils. It administers the county roads, public transport, dental care, culture, and cultural heritage. The administrative centre of the county is the town of Bodø.

County government
The Nordland county council is made up of 45 representatives that are elected every four years. The council essentially acts as a Parliament or legislative body for the county. The council is led by a county mayor, and the council elects five members to be in the county cabinet which carries out the executive functions of the county.

County council
The party breakdown of the council is as follows:

References

 
County Municipality
County municipalities of Norway
Public transport administrators of Norway
Public transport in Nordland
1838 establishments in Norway